Love Sides is the seventh studio album by American-Australian singer Marcia Hines. The album was her last pop album until 1994 as Hines decided to concentrate on theatre work.

Track listing

NB: The Dutch release has a different track list order and the inclusion of the track "Many Rivers to Cross".

Personnel
Adapted from album liner.
 Drums – Preston Heyman
 Guitar – Ray Russell
 Bass – Felix Krish
 Synthesizers – Richard Cottle
 Piano – Charlie Hull, Cliff Hall
 Percussion – Barry Guard

References

External links

1983 albums
Marcia Hines albums
Albums produced by David Mackay (producer)